Blera chillcotti is a species of hoverfly in the family Syrphidae.

Distribution
Nepal.

References

Eristalinae
Insects described in 2012
Diptera of Asia
Taxa named by F. Christian Thompson